Hapka is a surname. Notable people with the surname include:

Dustin Hapka (born 1983), American stock car racing driver
Mark Hapka (born 1982), American actor 
Petr Hapka (1944–2014), Czech composer